Patrick Madden may refer to:

 Paddy Madden (born 1990), Irish footballer
 Patrick Madden (essayist), writer and professor